Filipina singer and actress Lea Salonga has appeared in international theatre productions, television shows, films, and video games. She made her professional debut on stage in the 1978 Repertory Philippines production of The King and I. She went on to appear and star in productions such as Cat on a Hot Tin Roof (1978), Fiddler on the Roof (1978), Annie (1980), The Sound of Music (1980), The Rose Tattoo (1980), and The Bad Seed (1981) in Manila. In 1981, Salonga made her film debut as Lisa in the Filipino comedy Tropang Bulilit. Salonga continued performing in theatre productions in Manila, including The Goodbye Girl (1982), The Paper Moon (1983), a revival of Annie (1984), and The Fantasticks (1988). From 1983 to 1985, Salonga hosted her own television variety show entitled Love, Lea. In 1986, she also appeared as a Thursday group member on the television series That's Entertainment. Throughout the 1980s, she also appeared in the Filipino films Like Father, Like Son (1985), Ninja Kids (1986), Captain Barbell (1986), Pik Pak Boom (1988), and Dear Diary (1989).
 
Salonga rose to international recognition in 1989 after starring as Kim in the original West End production of Miss Saigon, a role she later reprised when the musical transferred to Broadway in 1991. A documentary entitled The Heat Is On, which details the creation and casting process of the original production, was filmed and released in 1989. In 1991, she appeared as Kim during the 65th Macy's Thanksgiving Day Parade. In 1992, Salonga finished her run in Miss Saigon to provide the singing voice for Princess Jasmine in Disney's Aladdin. In the same year, she returned to the Philippines to star as Sandy in the romantic drama film Bakit Labis Kitang Mahal. In 1993, Salonga returned to the Broadway stage as Éponine in Les Misérables. In the same year, she appeared as a guest star in Olsen Twins Mother's Day Special and Sesame Street and as a narrator in Reading Rainbow. In 1994, Salonga returned again to the Philippines to star as Eliza Doolittle in My Fair Lady before portraying The Witch in the Singapore production Into the Woods. In 1995, Salonga starred as Agnes in the Filipino film Sana Maulit Muli and Geri Riorden in the television film Redwood Curtain. Salonga also starred as Sandy Dombrowski in the Manila production of Grease before reprising the role of Éponine in the 10th anniversary concert of Les Misérables, which was filmed and later released in 1998. In 1996, Salonga once again reprised the role of Éponine in the West End production and third U.S. national tour of Les Misérables in Honolulu. In 1997, she began appearing as a guest performer and co-host in the Filipino variety show ASAP. In 1998, Salonga provided the singing voice for Mulan in Disney's Mulan. In 1999, Salonga starred as Sonia Walsk in the Singapore production of They're Playing Our Song, later reprising the role in the 2000 Manila production. In the same year, she also returned to the West End production of Miss Saigon as Kim to close the show as well as the Broadway production. In 2000, Salonga again reprised the same role in the original Manila production of Miss Saigon before returning once more to Broadway to close that production in 2001.

In 2001, Salonga appeared as Lien Hughes in the American soap opera As the World Turns, a role she later reprised in 2003. She also made a guest appearance as Amparo in the medical drama series ER. Also in 2001, Salonga began portraying Mei-Li in the Los Angeles production of Flower Drum Song. In 2002, Salonga returned to the Philippines to star as Catherine in the Manila production of Proof before reprising the role of Mei-Li in the Broadway revival of Flower Drum Song. While performing in this production, she also appeared as a guest performer in Something Good: A Broadway Salute to Richard Rogers on His 100th Birthday, which was filmed and televised. In 2004, Salonga starred as Lizzie Fields in the Manila production of Baby. She also provided the English voice of Yasuko Kusakabe in Disney's dub of My Neighbor Totoro, reprised the role of the singing voice of Mulan in Mulan II, and made a guest appearance on the animated series Johnny Bravo in the same year. In 2007, Salonga returned to Broadway to perform the role of Fantine in the revival of Les Misérables and reprised the role of the singing voice of Princess Jasmine in the film Disney Princess Enchanted Tales: Follow Your Dreams. In 2008, she portrayed the title role in the Asian tour of Rodgers and Hammerstein's Cinderella. 

In 2010, Salonga starred as Grizabella in the Manila production of Cats before reprising the role of Fantine at the 25th anniversary concert of Les Misérables, which was filmed and later released. In 2011, Salonga appeared as a judge for Miss Universe 2011 in São Paulo, Brazil, which was televised worldwide. In 2012, she portrayed Veronica in the Manila production of God of Carnage before starring as Kei Kimura in the original San Diego production of Allegiance. She also again reprised the role of the singing voice of Princess Jasmine in the American animated series Sofia the First. From 2013 to 2015, Salonga became appeared as one of the coaches on the reality television singing competition The Voice of the Philippines. In 2014, she also began appearing as a coach on The Voice Kids, returned to Sofia the First to reprise the role of the singing voice of Mulan, and performed at the 25th anniversary gala performance of Miss Saigon, which was filmed and later released in 2016. In 2015, Salonga returned to Broadway to reprise the role of Kei Kimura in the original Broadway production of Allegiance, which was filmed and released in theaters in 2016. In 2016, Salonga starred as Helen Bechdel in the Manila production of Fun Home, made a guest appearance on Crazy Ex-Girlfriend as Aunt Myrna, and provided the voice of Mother Nature in Nature Is Speaking. In 2017, she began appearing as a coach on The Voice Teens before portraying Erzulie in the Broadway revival of Once on This Island and performing the role during the 91st Macy's Thanksgiving Day Parade. In 2018, she portrayed Grace Farrell in the Hollywood Bowl production of Annie and narrated the film Expedition Reef before returning to the role of Erzulie to close the Broadway revival production of Once on This Island in 2019. In 2019, Salonga starred as Mrs. Lovett in the Manila and Singapore productions of Sweeney Todd: The Demon Barber of Fleet Street. In the same year, she appeared as Gail Garcia in the American film Yellow Rose.

In 2020, she returned as a coach on The Voice Teens. Later in the year, on November 27, her 2019 concert with the Sydney Symphony Orchestra was broadcast on PBS as part of the series Great Performances. In 2021, she voiced Mysterious Woman in the animated Netflix series Centaurworld. In 2022, she narrated an episode of the series American Experience before appearing in the recurring role of Elodie Honrada in the HBO Max drama series Pretty Little Liars: Original Sin. In the same year, she also provided the voices of Amalia and Dia in the adult animated sitcom series Little Demon. In December 2023, her 2022 Christmas concerts with the Tabernacle Choir will be broadcast on PBS.

Theatre

Film

Television

Video games

See also 

 List of awards and nominations received by Lea Salonga

References

External links 

 Lea Salonga at Internet Broadway Database
 

Lea Salonga
Actress filmographies
Philippine filmographies